The Volkswagen Transporter (T4), marketed in North America as the Volkswagen EuroVan, is a van produced by the German manufacturer Volkswagen Commercial Vehicles between 1990 and 2004, succeeding the Volkswagen Type 2 (T3) and superseded by the Volkswagen Transporter (T5).

History
Introduced in 1990, the T4 was the first Volkswagen van to have a front-mounted, water-cooled engine. Prompted by the success of similar moves with their passenger cars, Volkswagen had toyed with the idea of replacing their air-cooled, rear-engined T2 vans with a front-engined, water-cooled design in the late 1970s. The reasons for deciding in 1980 to instead introduce a new rear-engined T3 are unclear. Thus, the introduction of a front-engined layout was delayed until the arrival of the T4. After a run of nearly 14 years, T4 production ceased in 2003, making it second only to the T1 for length of production in its home market.

Chassis

Part of the success of the T4 was its versatility. It was available in many forms and sizes as standard and formed the basis of many specialist vehicles, from buses to campervans to ambulances.

Wheelbase
Two standard wheelbases were available; "short" (2920mm) and "long" (3320mm).

Body types

Van
 Panel Van - without any windows behind the b-pillar; single row of seats
 Kombi or Half-Panel - with additional windows between the b and c-pillars; 2 rows of seats
 Caravelle, Multivan and (in the US) EuroVan - with windows all round; 3 rows of seats

Pickup
 Single cab - based on a SWB chassis
 Double cab - based on a LWB chassis (aka Doka, from the German: Doppelkabine)
 Razor back - with a hydraulic rear body that was produced between 1998 and 2000 in the UK

Roofs
Panel vans were available with two different roof heights; standard (1940mm) and high-top (2430mm). High-tops were only manufactured on the LWB chassis, although campervan conversions often have pop-top or (usually fibreglass) high-tops added to both SWB and LWB chassis.

Doors
Vans have either a single, roof-hinged "tailgate" or two "barn" doors at the rear and either a single (passenger side) or twin (both sides) sliding doors.

Long and short-nose
There was one major facelift to the T4, in 1996, when a re-shaped, longer front end was introduced. This was needed to fit the six-cylinder VR6 engine into the T4's engine bay. Initially, only Caravelles and Multivans were available with the longer nose, since these were the only models available with the VR6 engine.

The commercial variants continued to be produced with the shorter nose until 2003. However, campers and other specialist vehicles produced between 1996 and 2003 may have either the short or the long nose, depending on which model was used as the base vehicle. In keeping with the Type 2's naming convention, the short and long-nose versions are also informally known as T4a and T4b, respectively.

Four Wheel Drive (Syncro)
The T4 was also available with a permanent 4WD system that uses a Viscous coupling unit as a centre differential to regulate the distribution of torque to the rear axle. These models are called "syncro" and were available with the 2.4D, 2.5Tdi and 2.5 petrol engines on all body types and both wheelbases. Some syncro models also have a mechanically locking rear differential. Since the rear differential precludes the placement of the spare wheel in the usual place under the body, syncro vans either store it inside the body or on an external, hinged bracket.

Campervans
The T4 is a very popular base for building a small to medium-sized camper and day-vans, both as self-build projects and for professional conversions. Volkswagen themselves also sold campervan versions of the T4. Outside of the US these were made by and named after their contractor, Westfalia-Werke. These Westfalia-Werke built campervans were named 'California', except in Canada where they were called simply 'Westfalia'.
.

Winnebago Industries was the primary converter of VW T4 campers sold in the US.

Engines

Petrol engines

Diesel engines
Indirect injection

Turbocharged Direct Injection

Enthusiasts' groups
Due largely to its versatility, as well as popularity as a campervan, the Volkswagen Transporter (including the T4) has an extensive following amongst enthusiasts. Meetings are held regularly throughout the year in countries across Europe and there are several Internet forums dedicated to T4 owners and enthusiasts.

In May 2010, the German enthusiasts of the T4 held a celebration of the 20th anniversary of the production of the first T4. Several hundred T4s took part with vans from as far afield as Russia, France, Spain, central Europe and the Nordic countries.

T4 in North America (EuroVan)

The Transporter T4 was exported to North America from 1992 until 2003 under the moniker EuroVan.

In the United States, the short wheelbase EuroVan 5-cylinder passenger models (CL, GL, GLS, and MV) were only sold for model year 1993. Smaller than a standard American delivery van, but larger than an American or Japanese passenger minivan, Volkswagen played up its size with the slogan, "EuroVan: There's nothing mini about it". Volkswagen only imported them to the U.S. market for one year because sales in the United States were disappointing, but sales continued in Canada and Mexico. Volkswagen reintroduced the EuroVan passenger models in the United States for model year 1999 with a VR6 engine as standard, but discontinued the T4 worldwide after 2003. The manual gearbox was not offered in North America with the VR6 engine.

Volkswagen imported the short wheelbase EuroVan 5-cylinder petrol engine passenger models (CL, GL, GLS, MV Weekender and Westfalia Camperised) to Canada from 1991 to 1996. The 77 hp 2.4 litre diesel engine was optional in Canada between 1993 and 1996. The long wheelbase version was also on offer in 1992 only as a 10 seaters CL or GL model trim. Kombi and crewcab pickup versions (sold as Transporter) were also available in 1992. A panel version (LWB only) was sold from 1993 to 1997.

The EuroVan Camper by Winnebago was introduced to the United States and Canada in 1995 with the five-cylinder engine, and upgraded to the VR6 for the 1997-2003 models. These were only available on the longer  wheelbase T4. These small pop top camper vans are unique in North America and have developed a cult following.

Winnebago also built three small Class C motorhomes with the forward cab of the T4/EuroVan called the Rialta, Vista, and Sunstar (Itasca branded). The Rialta was available in 1995-1996 with the five-cylinder engine, in 1997-2001 with the AES version of the VR6, and in 2002-2005 with the AXK engine. The Vista and Sunstar were only produced in 2002-2004, all using the AXK engine.

In the United States, the models were:
 the seven-seat EuroVan CL, GL, and GLS
 the EuroVan MV, in which the second row of seats face the rear and are removable, the third row converts into a bed, a folding table in the passenger area, window curtains, and a fluorescent lamp above table.
 the EuroVan MV Weekender, an MV plus a Westfalia conversion that adds a pop-top roof, a second overhead bed, bug screens for side windows and rear hatch, full set of curtains, auxiliary battery, fluorescent interior lights and under seat thermoelectric cooler.
 the EuroVan Camper, which is the long wheelbase commercial van converted by Winnebago Industries to include a pop-top roof, two two-person beds, seating for four (plus optional single or two-person seats in the middle), a one cubic foot refrigerator that runs on propane, DC, or AC, a propane furnace, a closet, cabinets, sink with cold water and a grey water tank, a two-burner propane stove, two two-person dinette tables, coach battery, house lighting, and the two front bucket seats made to swivel around to face the dinette/kitchen area.

See also
 Volkswagen Transporter – for an overview of the Transporter generations

References

External links
 Volkswagen T4 1990-2003: Transporter, Caravelle, Multivan, Camper and Eurovan – An in-depth history of the Transporter T4.

1990s cars
2000s cars
All-wheel-drive vehicles
Front-wheel-drive vehicles
Minivans
Vans
Minibuses
Pickup trucks
Vehicles introduced in 1990
Cars powered by VR engines
Transporter (T4)